Matheu is a town in the Escobar Partido of the Buenos Aires Province, Argentina.

Escobar Partido
Populated places in Buenos Aires Province